Control Room is an Indian Hindi-language crime thriller television series which will be aired on Dangal TV under the banner of Beyond Dreams Entertainment. It stars Nishant Singh Malkani, Samiksha Jaiswal and Rahil Azam.

Cast 
Nishant Singh Malkani as ACP Ayushman Sharma
 Samiksha Jaiswal as ACP Sugandha Singh
 Rahil Azam as Lawyer Mohit Chettani.
 Shivangi Verma as Forensic Expert Nazneen
 Anand Suryavanshi as DCP Shantanu Vyas
 Aashish Kaul

References 

2022 Indian television series debuts
Hindi-language television shows
Indian action television series
Fictional portrayals of police departments in India
Dangal TV original programming
Indian crime television series
Fictional portrayals of the Maharashtra Police